King Pellinore  (alternatively Pellinor, Pellynore and other variants) is the king of Listenoise (possibly the Lake District) or of "the Isles" (possibly Anglesey, or perhaps the medieval kingdom of the same name) in Arthurian legend. In the tradition from the Old French prose, he is associated with the Questing Beast and is the slayer of King Lot. His many children include the sons Aglovale, Lamorak, and Percival, and the daughter Dindrane.

In medieval literature 

Pellinore is a major figure in the 13th-century Post-Vulgate prose cycle and the sections of Thomas Malory's Le Morte d'Arthur based on it. There, as son of King Pellam and brother of Kings Pelles (the Fisher King) and Alain, he is most famous for his endless hunt of the Questing Beast, which he is tracking when King Arthur first meets him. Though he claims his bloodline is destined perpetually to chase this bizarre monster, Sir Palamedes the Saracen takes up the quest, and, according to one version, slays the beast. 

Pellinore beats King Arthur after three jousts and breaks the sword Arthur had withdrawn from the stone (in some versions this is Excalibur, though he gets another sword of that name from the Lady of the Lake soon after). Merlin throws a spell of enchantment on Pellinore to save Arthur's life. Arthur praises Pellinore's skill, and they soon become friends, with Arthur inviting him to join the Round Table. Pellinore then helps Arthur in his early wars against rebelling vassals, but when he kills King Lot of Orkney during the Battle of Tarabel (or Dimilioc), he sparks a blood feud between his and Lot's family that results in his death by Gawain and his brothers and the deaths of many others. 

Pellinore was said to have been of the royal line of Joseph of Arimathea, whose dynasty guards the Holy Grail, according to Arthurian lore. In the Livre d'Artus, Pellinore is called the "Maimed King" after being wounded by a holy spear, having doubted the powers of the Grail.

Pellinore has many legitimate and illegitimate children. His sons Tor, Aglovale, Lamorak, Dornar, and Percival all eventually join the Round Table as well. It is Percival, who was one of the first Grail seekers, and his grand nephew, Galahad, who finally succeeds in the quest. His daughter, Percival's sister, sometimes known as Dindrane, becomes a servant of the Grail and helps them achieve the mystical objective as the "Grail heroine". Another of his daughters, Alyne, dies early when he unknowingly ignores her pleas for help during his pursuit of the Questing Beast.

In modern fiction 
 In T. H. White's The Once and Future King, he is a bumbling but endearing old man who cannot give up his search for the "Questin' Beast" lest the poor creature die of loneliness. He also tends to say the word "what" after his sentences (Merlyn makes fun of him by stating: "…Or, if I were King Pellinore, I would say 'what what, what?'") In White's novel, Pellinore is vengefully put to death by Sir Gawain and/or his brothers, for unintentionally killing their father, King Lot of Orkney, in a jousting match.
Pellinore appears in the 1963 Walt Disney Studios film adaptation of The Sword in the Stone, where he is voiced by actor Alan Napier. A friend of Sir Ector, he announces the jousting tournament that will be held in London, with the winner being crowned king. Pellinore is mild-mannered, and wise, appalled at the idea of Kay being king due to his bitter nature. He is one of the first to recognise the sword pulled by Arthur from the stone. He, also along with another knight, Sir Bart, stands up for Arthur, and encourages the boy to successfully remove the sword from the stone.
 In the musical Camelot, Pellinore (or "Pelly", as he is often called by Arthur) is a comical, much-loved, permanent guest of Arthur and Guinevere. He is however, somewhat unsure of Arthur's new ideas for a new order of chivalry, being against "...any new ideas" on principle. Pellinore is still with Arthur before Arthur fights his final battle at the end of the play/film; and when Arthur knights the young boy "Tom of Warwick".
 In Bernard Cornwell's The Warlord Chronicles, Pellinore is represented as an old mad man, kept in a cage and commanding imaginary armies. After King Gundleus' sacking of the Tor at Ynys Wydryn (Avalon), Pellinore is retrieved from the Tor by Arthur's men and taken to Caer Cadarn, where he is locked in a store room. While there, Owain argues that he should be sent to the Isle of the Dead, however when Arthur decides to rebuild the Tor, Pellinore is sent back with Nimue and Morgan to continue his life as before.

External links
Pellinore at The Camelot Project
Pellinore, King of Listinoire at Britannia.com

Arthurian characters
Knights of the Round Table
Legendary British kings